This article lists the results for the Thailand national football team between 2010 and 2019.
 Only record the results that affect the FIFA/Coca-Cola World Ranking. See FIFA 'A' matches criteria.

2010

2011

2012

2013

2014

2015

2016

2017

2018

2019

External links 
 Football Association of Thailand 
 Thai Football.com
 Thai football page of Fifa.com
 Thai football Blog

2010
2010s in Thai sport